Daniel Zederayko Daniels (November 8, 1908 – November 11, 1991) was an educator, merchant, farmer and political figure in Saskatchewan. He represented Pelly from 1944 to 1948 in the Legislative Assembly of Saskatchewan as a Co-operative Commonwealth Federation (CCF) member.

Life
He was born near Gorlitz, Saskatchewan, the son of Daniel Daniels and Axana Hanthar, both Ukrainian immigrants to Canada. Daniels was educated in Yorkton and Regina. In 1937, he married Kathleen Franko. Daniels also taught school in Saskatchewan for 8 years. He lived in Canora. Daniels was defeated by John Gray Banks when he ran for reelection to the provincial assembly in 1948. He served as mayor of Canora from 1952 to 1958. Daniels later served as president of the Canora Union Hospital and as vice-president of the Saskatchewan seniors' association. He died at the Canora Union Hospital at the age of 83.

References 

1908 births
1991 deaths
Canadian people of Ukrainian descent
People from Canora, Saskatchewan
Mayors of places in Saskatchewan
Saskatchewan Co-operative Commonwealth Federation MLAs
20th-century Canadian politicians